Bełcz Wielki is a village in the administrative district of Gmina Niechlów, within Góra County, Lower Silesian Voivodeship, in south-western Poland.

The village has an approximate population of 320.

References

Villages in Góra County